Taoyuan District, formerly known as Taoyuan City prior to the establishment of the special municipality of Taoyuan in 2014, is a district of Taoyuan City in northwestern Taiwan. The municipal seat of Taoyuan City is situated within its borders. It is the most populous district among the 13 districts of Taoyuan City, and the second most populous among the districts of Taiwan, with the most populous being Banqiao District in New Taipei City.

History

Taoyuan is the native home of the plains tribes of Taiwanese aborigines. Taoyuan's old name was Toahong since there used to be many peach blossoms in the area.

Empire of Japan

Under Japanese rule, the area was part of  established in November 1901. In 1920, it was renamed , and incorporated into Tōen District, Shinchiku Prefecture.

Republic of China
After the handover of Taiwan from Japan to the Republic of China, it was reorganized as Taoyuan Town of Taoyuan County. On 21 April 1971, the town was upgraded from an urban township to a county-administered city called Taoyuan City. On 25 December 2014, the city became a district of the newly formed special municipality of Taoyuan City.

Geography
Taoyuan is located on the Taoyuan Plateau, contiguous on the northeast to Guishan District. The Nankan River is Taoyuan's largest river, flowing from the southeast to the northwest.

 Area: 
 Elevation: 
 Population: 464,480 people (February 2023)

Climate
Taoyuan has a humid subtropical climate (Köppen climate classification: Cfa), with hot summers and mild winters. Precipitation is high throughout the year and is generally higher in the first half of the year. Due to the effect of wind from mainland China, Taoyuan is typically cooler than New Taipei, despite having a lower latitude.

Administrative divisions

Dalin, Dafeng, Jianguo, Yunlin, Fuan, Fulin, Fenglin, Zhonghe, Zhongxing, Wenhua, Wenchang, Wenming, Beimen, Minsheng, Yongxing, Guangxing, Ximen, Xihu, Wuling, Zhangmei, Nanmen, Nanhua, Zhongshan, Zhongping, Zhongzheng, Zhongcheng, Zhongxin, Zhongyuan, Zhongtai, Zhongsheng, Zhonglu, Zhongde, Wenzhong, Yushan, Taishan, Longshan, Longan, Longgang, Longxiang, Longshou, Longfeng, Zhongpu, Zhongning, Beipu, Yongan, Tongan, Tongde, Zijiang, Xipu, Mingde, Tungpu, Zhangan, Zhangde, Xinguang, Nanpu, Zhuangjing, Ciwen, Xinpu, Ruiqing, Bao'an, Baoqing, Sanyuan, Sanmin, Dayou, Daxing, Chenggong, Bianzhou, Zhongyi, Tungshan, Tungmen, Jingxi, Chunri, Zhaoyang, Guiji, Wanshou and Baoshan Village.

Government institutions
 Taoyuan City Government
 Taoyuan City Council

Education
Within Taoyuan, there are 6 senior high schools, 14 junior high schools, 23 primary schools, and an "intelligence initiation school." Taoyuan is also home to a number of buxibans, or cram schools or language schools, which teach additional courses in mathematics, English, science, etc. There are also 10 universities located in Taoyuan.

Taoyuan Main Public Library is the central library of Taoyuan city. It is located in Xianfu Rd, Taoyuan District, near the Taoyuan City Government building.

Economy
Taoyuan was one of the host cities for the Taiwan European Film Festival in 2012.

Transportation
Taoyuan District is served by Taiwan Railway Administration's Taoyuan railway station. The current station is expected to be converted to an underground station in 2029. In addition, the future underground Zhonglu railway station is also expected to serve the district in 2030. Taoyuan Metro's Green line is also under construction and will serve the district in the future.

Railway 
Taoyuan railway station
Zhonglu railway station (under construction)

Metro 
Nankan Bus Station (2026)
Taoyuan Performance Arts Center metro station (2026)
Daxing West Road metro station (2027)
Minguang Road metro station (2027)
Yonghe Market metro station (2027)
Taoyuan Main Station (2027)
Yangming Park metro station (2027)

Bus

International relations

Twin towns – Sister cities
Taoyuan is twinned with:
 Radom, Poland
 Irvine, California, United States
 Kennewick, Washington, United States

Tourist attractions

 Chaoyang Forest Park

 Chinese Furniture Museum
 Coca-Cola Museum
 Daguixi Park
 Dayou Ecological Park
 Fenghe Park
 Guixi Riverside Park
 Hutou Mountain Park
 Hutoushan Environmental Park
 Sanmin Sports Park
 Taoyuan Arts Center
 Taoyuan Arts Plaza (桃園藝文廣場)
 Taoyuan Confucian Temple
 Taoyuan Land God Culture Museum (桃園市土地公文化館)
 Taoyuan Martyrs' Shrine
 
 Taoyuan Night Market
 Tong'an Parent-Child Park
 Yangming Sports Park

Notable natives
 Wu Ming-yi, artist and author

References

External links